Chad Eisele is an American college athletics administrator, golf coach, and former American football coach. He is the athletic director and head men's golf coach at Hampden–Sydney College in Hampden Sydney, Virginia. Eisele served as the head football coach at Lake Forest College in Lake Forest, Illinois from 2000 to 2004, Minnesota State University Moorhead in 2005, and at his alma mater, Knox College, in Galesburg, Illinois from 2010 to 2012, compiling career college football coaching record of 35–56.

Head coaching record

Football

References

Year of birth missing (living people)
Living people
American football defensive backs
Hampden–Sydney Tigers athletic directors
Knox Prairie Fire athletic directors
Knox Prairie Fire football coaches
Knox Prairie Fire football players
Lake Forest Foresters football coaches
Minnesota State–Moorhead Dragons football coaches
College golf coaches in the United States
College tennis coaches in the United States